Blacktown Boys High School (BBHS) is a government-funded single-sex academically partially selective secondary day school for boys, located in Blacktown, a western Sydney suburb of New South Wales, Australia. 

Established in 1956 as Blacktown High School, the school enrolled approximately 378 students in 2020, from Year 7 to Year 12, of whom 0.02 percent identified as Indigenous Australians and 97 percent were from a language background other than English. The school is operated by the NSW Department of Education in accordance with a curriculum developed by the New South Wales Education Standards Authority. The principal is David Calleja.  

Its sister school is Blacktown Girls High School which is located adjacent to the high school.

History
The school was originally established in January 1956 as the co-educational Blacktown High School. However, owing to a growing local population and in accordance with government policy, it was decided that the schools would be split into two single-sex schools: Blacktown Boys High School, and Blacktown Girls High School. Both were fully split by 1959. Blacktown Boys was officially opened on 17 October 1959 by the Deputy Premier and Minister of Education, Bob Heffron.

A school cadet unit was formed in 1961, and disbanded in the 1970s as multiple fights took place.

The school became a partially selective school in 2010.

Notable alumni
 Bob Brownformer politician and activist; former Leader of the Australian Greens; former Australian Senator; 1961 school captain 
 Charles Casuscellipolitician; former Liberal Party Member for Strathfield (2011–2015); Chair of the NSW Parliament's Transport and Infrastructure Committee
Graham Joseph Hill – theologian

See also 

 List of government schools in New South Wales
 List of boys' schools in New South Wales
 List of selective high schools in New South Wales
 Education in Australia

References

External links 
 

Public high schools in Sydney
Educational institutions established in 1959
1959 establishments in Australia
Boys' schools in New South Wales
Blacktown
Selective schools in New South Wales